Yōsuke, Yosuke, Yousuke or Yohsuke is a masculine Japanese given name.

Possible writings
Yōsuke can be written using different combinations of kanji characters. Here are some examples: 

洋介, "ocean, mediate"
洋助, "ocean, to help"
洋輔, "ocean, to help"
洋祐, "ocean, to help"
洋右, "ocean, right"
陽介, "sunshine, mediate"
陽助, "sunshine, to help"
陽輔, "sunshine, to help"
陽佑, "sunshine, to help"
葉介, "leaf, mediate"
庸介, "common, mediate"
容介, "contain, mediate"
容助, "contain, to help"
曜介, "weekday, mediate"
曜助, "weekday, to help"

The name can also be written in hiragana ようすけ or katakana ヨウスケ.

Notable people with the name

, Japanese actor and voice actor
, Japanese diver
, Japanese poet, actor and singer
, Japanese footballer
, Japanese ice hockey player
, Japanese baseball player
, Japanese rugby union player
, Japanese footballer
, Japanese footballer
, Japanese politician
, Japanese actor and singer
, Japanese footballer
, Japanese footballer
, Japanese footballer
, American classical violinist
, Japanese footballer
, Japanese ice hockey player
, Japanese politician
, Japanese actor
, Japanese anime screenwriter
, Japanese footballer
, Japanese diplomat and politician
, Japanese footballer
, Japanese footballer
, Japanese footballer
, Japanese badminton player
, Japanese footballer
, Japanese footballer
, Japanese boxer
, Japanese footballer
, Japanese footballer
, Japanese footballer
, Japanese footballer
, Japanese mixed martial artist
, Japanese politician
, Japanese politician
, Japanese manga artist
, Japanese baseball player
, Japanese figure skater
, Japanese politician
, Japanese photographer
, Japanese judoka
, Japanese jazz pianist

Fictional characters
Yosuke Hanamura (花村 陽介), character in the video game Persona 4
Yosuke Koiwai (小岩井 葉介), character in the manga Yotsuba&!
Yosuke Miyadai (宮台 陽介), character in the film Battle Royale II: Requiem
Yosuke Fuuma (風摩 ようすけ), character in the anime and manga Wedding Peach

Japanese masculine given names